Echo Presenta: Invasión is a compilation album by reggaeton producer Echo, released on July 24, 2007, with participation of Don Omar, Daddy Yankee, among others. The single "Delirando" by Wisin & Yandel, reached position 30 and 36 on the Billboard Tropical Airplay and Latin Rhythm charts respectively.

Track listing
"Intro" - Daddy Yankee, Don Omar, Cosculluela, Hector "El Father", Chyno Nyno, Jowell & Randy, Arcangel, & Voltio (produced by Echo & Diesel)
"Mi Nena" - Don Omar (produced by Echo & Diesel)
"Delirando" - Wisin & Yandel (produced by Nesty & Victor)
"Caliente" - Daddy Yankee ft. Jazze Pha
"Ando Ready" - Hector "El Father"
"No Juegues Más" - Jowell & Randy (produced by Dj Giann, Dexter & Mr. Greenz, & Echo)
"Sientan La Presión" - Arcángel (produced by DJ Giann)
"Carita de Ángel" - Angel & Khriz (produced by Santana)
"Como Toda Una Señora" - Dalmata 
"La Calle Llora" - Cosculluela ft. Mexicano
"Ilógico" - Los Yetzons ft. Alexis (produced by Mambo Kingz)
"Yal, Yal, Toma" - Voltio
"Una Cita" - Zion & Lennox 
"" - Fussion Musik 
"Me Gustas Tú" - Divino
"Déjala Sola" - Yaga & Mackie 
"Siente El Swing" - JQ 
"Baila Lento" - Klaze & Eztylo 
"Camina Derecho" - Cosculluela 
"Zumbenme" - Chyno Nyno 
"Siéntelo" - MJ (produced by Mambo Kingz)
"Como Yo" - TNT
[*]"Me Tienta" - Jayko (produced by Nesty & Victor)

[*] Indicates a Hidden Track.

Note: The song "Mi Nena" by Don Omar was used as the soundtrack of the film Fast & Furious in 2009.

Chart performance

References

Reggaeton compilation albums
2007 compilation albums
Albums produced by Jazze Pha